Antonio Martínez Felipe (born 7 March 1990) is a Spanish professional footballer who plays for Kuwaiti club Al-Salmiya SC as a midfielder.

Club career
Born in Madrid, Martínez joined Real Madrid's youth system in 2002, aged 12. In 2009–10, he made his senior debut with the C team, being promoted to the reserves the following season but featuring in only eight matches.

In the 2011–12 campaign, Martínez once again received very few opportunities, being loaned to fellow Segunda División B club CD Mirandés in January 2012. In July, as both sides achieved promotion, he returned to Castilla.

In January 2013, after failing to appear for Real B in the Segunda División, Martínez returned to Mirandés also on loan. He played his first game in that league on 23 February, featuring the full 90 minutes in a 2–0 away loss against Racing de Santander.

Martínez signed a one-year contract with fellow second-tier AD Alcorcón on 30 August 2013. He scored his first professional goal on 10 September, the second in the 4–1 away win over RCD Mallorca in the Copa del Rey.

On 2 July 2014, Martínez agreed to a new three-year deal with the Madrid side. On 25 January 2015 he scored a brace, but in a 3–2 defeat at Albacete Balompié.

On 1 July 2016, after a six-month loan spell at CD Numancia, Martínez cut ties with Alcorcón and joined Cultural y Deportiva Leonesa.

Career statistics

Honours
Real Madrid B
Segunda División B: 2011–12

Cultural Leonesa
Segunda División B: 2016–17

References

External links

1990 births
Living people
Spanish footballers
Footballers from Madrid
Association football midfielders
Segunda División players
Segunda División B players
Tercera División players
Real Madrid C footballers
Real Madrid Castilla footballers
CD Mirandés footballers
AD Alcorcón footballers
CD Numancia players
Cultural Leonesa footballers
Kuwait Premier League players
Al Salmiya SC players
Spanish expatriate footballers
Expatriate footballers in Kuwait
Spanish expatriate sportspeople in Kuwait